Neil Robert Fuller, OAM (born 2 August 1969 in Shoreham by Sea, Sussex)  is an Australian athlete, Paralympic competitor, and amputee.

During his youth, Neil was an ambitious soccer player, gaining a position playing at state level for South Australia. It was during a soccer match on 25 July 1987 that his tibia and fibula were broken, and a major artery in his right leg was severed in an attempted tackle to the shin. Legally
becoming an adult during his 22 days in hospital, he opted to have the lower part of his right leg amputated after gangrene had set in.

In February 1989, Fuller entered the Amputee Nationals in Adelaide in the 100m race, long jump and high jump. Fuller was then selected as a member of the Australian team to compete at the Far East and South Pacific International Championships where he competed in the 100m, long jump, high jump and the pentathlon.

After the accident, Fuller made a comeback into the world of sports becoming a world class runner and world record holder.

He is now coordinator of Sport at St Peters Collegiate Girls School in Adelaide, South Australia

Athletic Achievement 
In 1990, Fuller competed in the World Championships and Games for the Disabled in Assen, Netherlands winning a bronze medal in the men's long jump 7F. Fuller also participated in the 1998 World Championships in Birmingham, UK where he won four gold medals. He participated in four consecutive Summer Paralympic Games, from 1992 to 2004. In 1992 he won a gold medal, for which he received a Medal of the Order of Australia, two silver medals, and one bronze medal. At the 1996 Summer Paralympics, he won silver in the 100 and 200 metre races and gold in the 4×100 metre relay. Four years later, at the Sydney Paralympics, he won four gold medals in the 200 metres, 400 metres, 4×100 metre relay, and 4×400 metre relay, and a bronze in the 100 metres. At the 2004 Paralympics in Athens, he won two silver medals in the 400 metres and the 4×400 metre relay, and a bronze in the 4×100 metre relay.

Awards
He was inducted into the Athletics South Australia Hall of Fame in 1997.

In 2012, Neil was inducted into the South Australia Sport Hall of Fame.

In 2000, Fuller received an Australian Sports Medal for "service to amputee athletics as World Class Competitor and Development of National Training Squad".

In 2001, he was inducted into the Australian Institute of Sport 'Best of the Best'<ref>Australian Institute of Sport 'Best of the Best'  </</ref>

References

External links

 ABC news article
 Athletics.org profile
 Neil Fuller at Australian Athletics Historical Results
 

English emigrants to Australia
Paralympic athletes of Australia
Athletes (track and field) at the 1992 Summer Paralympics
Athletes (track and field) at the 1996 Summer Paralympics
Athletes (track and field) at the 2000 Summer Paralympics
Athletes (track and field) at the 2004 Summer Paralympics
Paralympic gold medalists for Australia
Paralympic silver medalists for Australia
Paralympic bronze medalists for Australia
Australian amputees
Recipients of the Medal of the Order of Australia
Recipients of the Australian Sports Medal
Sportsmen from South Australia
Living people
Australian Institute of Sport Paralympic track and field athletes
1969 births
Medalists at the 1992 Summer Paralympics
Medalists at the 1996 Summer Paralympics
Medalists at the 2000 Summer Paralympics
Medalists at the 2004 Summer Paralympics
Paralympic medalists in athletics (track and field)
Australian male sprinters
Sprinters with limb difference
Paralympic sprinters